Nieves Mardie Cornejo (born August 5, 1951) is an American former professional baseball relief pitcher who played Major League Baseball (MLB) for the  New York Mets.

Draft history
Cornejo was first selected by the Washington Senators, in the third round of the  amateur draft, and again in the second round of the secondary phase of the 1970 draft, but did not sign. The Mets drafted him in the third round of the secondary phase of the  amateur draft, and were also unable to sign him. He eventually signed with the Mets when they drafted him again in the 21st round of the  amateur draft.

MLB debut
In the second game of the season against the Montreal Expos, Cornejo entered the game in the eighth inning with the Expos leading 5–2, and pitched the final two innings without giving up a run. The Mets, meanwhile, scored two in the eighth and two in the ninth to earn the victory for Cornejo in his Major League debut. Despite respectable numbers (4-2, 2.45 earned run average), Cornejo was back in Tidewater by the end of the season.

Detroit Tigers
Prior to the start of the  season, he was traded to the Detroit Tigers for Ed Glynn. After one season with the Tigers' triple-A affiliate, the Evansville Triplets, Cornejo retired from baseball.

External links

Mardie Cornejo at Baseball Almanac

Living people
1951 births
New York Mets players
Major League Baseball pitchers
Baseball players from Kansas
People from Wellington, Kansas